Past Life Recordings is a limited-edition compilation LP by Glorium and was released on Existential Vacuum Records in 1997. It contains material from the band's first two studio sessions from January 1992 and November 1992, including their first 2 singles. 300 copies were pressed, all silk-screened on white vinyl.

Track listing 
 "Chemical Angel"+ – 2:53
 "Groundfloor"+ – 4:18
 "Madonna"+ – 4:29
 "Dive-Bomb"+ – 4:35
 "Believe in Nothing"+ – 3:18
 "Collision"+ – 3:57
 "Hole in Your Art" – 4:15 
 "Ashes"++ – 3:28
 "Poisons"++ – 3:15
 "Sound Asleep"++ 2–49
 "Iced The Swelling"++ – 3:34
 "Fearless"++ – 3:04

Personnel 
George Lara – bass
Juan Miguel Ramos – drums
Ernest Salaz – guitar, vocals
Lino Max – guitar, vocals
Paul Streckfus – vocals
 Robbie Dennis+ – engineer
 Lisa Rickenberg++ – engineer at Lonestar Studios

References 

Glorium albums
1997 albums